The Farman HF.16 was a reconnaissance aircraft built in France shortly before the First World War.

Operators

 Aviation Militaire Belge/Belgische militaire luchtvaart - received four HF.16s in 1912

Specifications (HF.16)

References

Further reading
 

 

1910s French military reconnaissance aircraft
HF.16
Single-engined pusher aircraft
Aircraft first flown in 1912
Rotary-engined aircraft